Until 1 January 2007 Ryslinge municipality was a municipality (Danish, kommune) in the former Funen County on the island of Funen in central Denmark.  The municipality covered an area of 82 km2, and had a total population of 6,924 (2005).  Its last mayor was Gunnar Landtved, a member of the Venstre (Liberal Party) political party. The main town and the site of its municipal council was the town of Ryslinge.

 Gislev Parish (Gudme Herred)
 Kværndrup Parish (Sunds Herred)
 Ryslinge Parish (Gudme Herred)

Ryslinge municipality ceased to exist as the result of Kommunalreformen ("The Municipality Reform" of 2007).  It was merged with Broby, Faaborg, Ringe, and Årslev municipalities to form the new Faaborg-Midtfyn municipality.   This created a municipality with an area of 638 km2 and a total population of 51,144 (2005).  The new municipality belongs to Region of Southern Denmark.

External links 
 Faaborg-Midtfyn municipality's official website (Danish only)

References 
 Municipal statistics: NetBorger Kommunefakta, delivered from KMD aka Kommunedata (Municipal Data)
 Municipal mergers and neighbors: Eniro new municipalities map

Former municipalities of Denmark